Gerhard "Knall" Koall (7 June 1912 – 27 April 1945) was a Luftwaffe ace and recipient of the Knight's Cross of the Iron Cross during World War II. The Knight's Cross of the Iron Cross was awarded to recognise extreme battlefield bravery or successful military leadership. Gerhard Koall was killed on 27 April 1945 after being hit by Soviet anti-aircraft fire near Anklam. During his career he was credited with 37 victories, 35 on the Eastern Front and 2 during the Invasion of Yugoslavia.

Career
Koall was born on 7 June 1912 in Königsberg in the Kingdom of Prussia of the German Empire. Today it is Kaliningrad in Kaliningrad Oblast, the Russian exclave between Poland and Lithuania on the Baltic Sea.

On 23 February 1942, Koall was appointed Staffelkapitän (squadron leader) of 3. Staffel of Jagdgeschwader 54 (JG 54—54th Fighter Wing). He replaced Hauptmann Hans Schmoller-Haldy who had been wounded in combat that day. The Staffel was subordinated to I. Gruppe of JG 54 which was headed by Hauptmann Hans Philipp.

In mid-April 1943, a newly formed Jabostaffel (fighter bomber squadron) was formed and labeled 13.(Jabo) Staffel of JG 54 and placed under the command of Koall.

In late-February 1944, Koall succeeded Hauptmann Siegfried Schnell as Gruppenkommandeur (group commander) of IV. Gruppe of JG 54 after Schnell had been killed in action on 25 February.

Summary of career

Aerial victory claims
Mathews and Foreman, authors of Luftwaffe Aces — Biographies and Victory Claims, researched the German Federal Archives and found documentation for 37 aerial victory claims. This number includes 35 claims on the Eastern Front and two over the Western Allies in Yugoslavia.

Awards
 Aviator badge
 Front Flying Clasp of the Luftwaffe in Gold
 Iron Cross (1939) 2nd and 1st Class
 Honour Goblet of the Luftwaffe on 1 March 1943 as Hauptmann and Staffelkapitän
 German Cross in Gold o 17 October 1943 as Hauptmann in II./Jagdgeschwader 54
 Knight's Cross of the Iron Cross on 10 October 1944 as Hauptmann and Gruppenkommandeur of the IV./Jagdgeschwader 54

References

Citations

Bibliography

External links
TracesOfWar.com
Aces of the Luftwaffe

1912 births
1945 deaths
Military personnel from Königsberg
German World War II flying aces
Recipients of the Gold German Cross
Recipients of the Knight's Cross of the Iron Cross
Luftwaffe personnel killed in World War II
Aviators killed by being shot down